Rye is a coastal suburb of New York City in Westchester County, New York, United States, within the New York metropolitan area. It is separate from the Town of Rye, which has more land area than the city. The City of Rye, formerly the Village of Rye, was part of the Town until it received its charter as a city in 1942, making it the youngest city in the State of New York. Its population density for its 5.85 square miles of land is roughly 2,729.76/sq mi.

Rye is notable for its waterfront which covers 60 percent of the city's six square miles and is governed by a waterfront act instituted in 1991. Located in the city are two National Historic Landmarks: the Boston Post Road Historic District was designated a National Historic Landmark by the National Park Service in 1993; its centerpiece is the Jay Estate, the childhood home of John Jay, a Founding Father and the first Chief Justice of the United States.

Playland, a historic amusement park designated a National Historic Landmark in 1987 is also located in Rye. Playland features one of the oldest wooden roller coasters in the Northeast, the Dragon Coaster.

History 

Rye was once a part of Fairfield County, Connecticut, belonging to the Sachem Ponus, of the Ponus Wekuwuhm, Canaan Parish, and was probably named for that chieftain, "Peningoe Neck".

It was founded in 1660 by three men: Thomas Studwell, Peter Disbrow and John Coe. Later landowners included John Budd and family.

During the 19th and early 20th centuries it was a haven for wealthy Manhattanites who traveled by coach or boat to escape the city heat. Its location on Long Island Sound and numerous beaches also appealed to visitors with more moderate means who gravitated for short stays at cottages and waterfront hotels.

It has an extraordinary inventory of buildings with architectural distinction that help visually articulate specific neighborhoods and districts.

Planning and zoning
Planning and zoning oversight is vested in several branches of the Rye government including several volunteer staffed committees like the Planning Commission, the Architectural Review Board, the Sustainability Committee, the Conservation Committee and the Landmarks Committee to name a few.

Master plan (1985)
The City's current Master Plan guides the planning process. Also known as a  Comprehensive plan, it was authored 37 years ago with an expectation that it would be updated again in 2000. Attempts to revise the 1985 document with community input as recommended in NY State's Statute on Comprehensive Planning were made in 2016 and 2017. The review, which was aimed to reflect current conditions of growth and forecast future changes, was not completed. As of 2018, Rye lagged behind almost all of the 43 municipalities in Westchester County in updating this "serious document".

Failure to modernize the 1985 Master Plan on that schedule has produced concerns from residents about the lack of community consensus, lack of informed and coordinated regulation of development and the subsequent impacts including increased flooding and a higher than expected volume of teardowns. Other concerns include threats to historical resources, cultural resources, natural resources, sensitive coastal and environmental areas and numerous other negative repercussions on neighborhood character. Previous Master Plans for Rye were created in 1929, 1945, and in 1963.

Local Waterfront Revitalization Plan (1991)
Rye is a coastal community with numerous sensitive wetlands and watercourses. In 1991, the City of Rye adopted a comprehensive plan to further regulate land and water usage to protect and preserve these fragile resources.

Sustainability plan (2013)
In 2010, spurred by disastrous flooding events in 2007 and other environmental concerns, the Rye Sustainability Committee (RSC) was formed and tasked with creating a plan to inform best environmental and land stewardship practices for the city. A sustainability plan was formally adopted in December 2013

Neighborhoods
Many of Rye's unique neighborhoods are defined in the 1985 Master Plan. Many have historic significance and their preservation was signaled as important for enhancing Rye's character. They include:

Proposed National Register District

Soundview Park 
Church Row 

Local or National Register Significance

Dogwood/Upper Dogwood Lane
Grace Church Street Area
Milton Harbor
Kirby Mill
Post Road Old Cottage District
Central Business District
Dublin (West Rye)
Greenhaven
Indian Village
Loudon Woods
Rye Town Park
Hix Park

Geography

Rye is "situated in the eastern part of central Westchester County on Long Island Sound. The western border of the City generally parallels Beaver Swamp Brook, while the eastern border is formed by Milton Harbor and the Sound. Blind Brook traverses the City from the northwest corner of Rye to Milton Harbor at the southern end."

Rock and wetlands

The geology and hydrology of Rye is characterized by a significant quantity of rock, marshes and wetlands  which makes the city both desirably scenic but also challenging for developers.

Rye's bedrock is predominantly constituted of Fordham gneiss and Harrison diorite also known as Byram Black granite.

According to Rye's 1985 Master Plan, "Rye contains a variety of environmentally significant areas. Numerous tidal and freshwater wetlands are found near the waterfront and brooks. The Milton Harbor area (including the Marshlands Conservancy and Rye Golf Club), Disbrow Park and the Manursing area contain the most extensive wetlands in the City. In addition, substantial areas near the Sound, Milton Harbor, Blind Brook and Beaver Swamp Brook are within the 100 year flood hazard area, and thus subject to potential flooding." According to the City of Rye, "Considerable acreage of these important natural resources has been lost or impaired by draining, dredging, filling, excavating, building, polluting and other acts inconsistent with the natural uses of such areas. Remaining wetlands are in jeopardy of being lost, despoiled or impaired by such acts contrary to the public safety and welfare." As a result,
the City has charged itself with the responsibility of "preventing the despoilation and destruction of wetlands and watercourses while taking into account varying ecological, economic, recreational and aesthetic values. Activities that may damage wetlands or watercourses should be located on upland sites in such a manner as not to degrade these systems."

In 2017, Rye resident and then New York State Senator George Latimer noted that wetlands maps for the area have not been updated in over 20 years

Flooding
Flooding has long been an issue in Rye as in other coastal towns with water coming in from Long Island Sound. The Blind Brook watershed is also a source of that flooding with significant deluges recorded in the neighborhood of Indian Village after four days of rain in October 1975.

Three major weather events in just five years produced catastrophic damage in the town.
 Following major flooding in March 2007, the April 2007 nor'easter six weeks later left some homes in Rye with over five feet of floodwater.
 In 2011, the after effects of Hurricane Irene in August and Hurricane Maria in September included swelling of Blind Brook and submersion of private and commercial properties including the Rye Nature Center, Indian Village, the Rye High football field, businesses on Purchase Street and homes on Milton and Highland Roads.
 Storm surges from Hurricane Sandy in 2012 resulted in evacuations of many coastal residences and facilities including the Milton firehouse.

The City's response to these recurring hazards was to apply for funding through the NY Rising Community Reconstruction Program. Rye received $3,000,000 to safeguard the city against future flooding threats, upgrade its infrastructure for resiliency, identify stormwater mitigation solutions, and protect historic buildings and natural wetlands.

Starting on September 1, 2021, Rye experienced another substantial flooding event. The storm lasted two days and caused significant damage to municipal facilities, businesses and residences. Areas around Indian Village and other sections of the city that had previously flooded during Hurricane Irene were under 8–9 feet of water. Other areas around the town normally not affected by flooding were also affected.  Prior to the flooding event, Rye had undergone approximately five inches of rainfall from Hurricane Henri. Two weeks later, the remnants Hurricane Ida dropped another 8–9 inches of rain in the area within a 12 hour period.
Hurricane Ida remnants caused flooding in Rye nearly 10 years to the day from Hurricane Irene.

Archaeological significance and notable indigenous sites
As of 2010, seventy-five percent of the acreage in Rye or the equivalent of 3,954 acres had been determined to be archaeologically sensitive with many Indigenous and First Nations contact sites. At least two villages have been determined to have existed, one on Manursing Island and the other on today's Milton Point.

The presence of Indigenous people's activities has been noted in numerous locations where implements and bones were unearthed, including an "ancient Indian burial ground, site of the present Playland Casino"  together with discoveries of artifacts along the shoreline, pottery, skeletons and relics along Milton Road, Disbrow Park  and throughout today's Boston Post Road Historic District including Marshlands Conservancy.

The presence of Indigenous people in Rye was more recently documented in a 2012 Phase IA archaeological investigation commissioned by Westchester County in connection with the construction of a bike path along the Playland Parkway in Rye. Within just one mile of the project site, the report noted a dozen archeologically sensitive areas. The publication included supporting data from files in the repositories of NYOPRHP and the NY State Museum; it further highlighted the existence of shell middens, evidence of camp sites and at least two burial grounds. One of these documented sites included the Blind Brook. Additional findings have been made at the Jay Estate in archaeological digs conducted by Dr. Eugene Boesch and submitted to the NY State Cultural Resource Information System (CRIS).

Demographics 

As of the 2020 United States Census, there were 16,592 people living in the city. This is representative of approximately 5491 households. 74.8% have a college degree. 15.5% were over the age of 65 and 51.7% were women. 88.2% identified themselves as White alone. 1.3% identified as Black or African American alone. 6.7% identified as Hispanic or Latino. 5.6% identified as Asian alone.

Economy
According to a 2018 USA Today article, Rye is ranked 30th among America's wealthiest towns based on the following data: the median household income was $162,394; the median house value was $1,107,000. 

Rye is home to:
 Con Edison
 Jarden a Fortune 500 company,
 GAMCO Investors, Inc., (formerly known as Gabelli Asset Management Company)
 Sims Metal Management

Arts and culture

Lectures, concerts, exhibits and classes
 Jay Heritage Center
 Rye Arts Center
 Rye Free Reading Room
 Rye Historical Society
 Wainwright House (1928)(5 acres) – Historic estate with gardens and central building commissioned by US Congressman J. Mayhew Wainwright. In 1951, the property was re-imagined as a religious center "for research and training in the laws of God for Human Conduct." It was donated by Mrs. Philip King Condict to the Layman's Movement for a Christian World, an ecumenical organization serving New York men in business, banking and the law.  Complaints about departure from its core mission of “inspiring greater understanding through body, mind, spirit and community” have mired the "nonsectarian spiritual and educational center" in controversy repeatedly since 1996 when the organization's $2.2 million endowment was completely depleted.

Largest annual community events

 Rye Little League Parade (April)
 American Legion Memorial Day Parade (May)
 Rye Sidewalk Sale (July)
 Jay Day (September)
 Rye Harrison Football Game (October)
 Rye Window Painting (October)
 Rye Turkey Trot (November)
 Mistletoe Magic (December)

Service and Volunteer Organizations
 American Legion Post 128 
 Rye City Lions

Historic sites
Of the more than 2600 National Historic Landmark (NHL) sites in the country, Rye has two: the Boston Post Road Historic District  and Playland Amusement Park

Boston Post Road Historic District (Rye, New York) (NRHP listing 1982) (NPS designation 1994)

Includes 5 historically significant parcels; much of the land was originally the ancestral home of American Founding Father John Jay. It is where he grew up and where he is buried.

  Jay Estate – 23 acre park with gardens operated by the Jay Heritage Center. Restoration of the Jay Mansion (1838) overlooking Long Island Sound was an official project of the Save America's Treasures Program. The Jay Mansion is the oldest National Historic Landmark (NHL) structure in New York State with a geothermal heating and cooling system and the first in Westchester County to have such an energy efficient system. Member site of the Hudson River Valley National Heritage Area. It is also listed on Westchester County's African American Heritage Trail. Other historic buildings at the estate include a 1760s farmhouse, 1907 Zebra House and Carriage House, late 1800s Ice House and a 1917 Tennis House.
  Lounsbury (1836–38)
  Marshlands Conservancy (dates back to Indigenous peoples era; part of original Jay Estate – partitioned in 1966)
  Whitby Castle (Rye Golf Club)(1852–54)
  The Jay Cemetery (established 1805)

Rye Playland (NRHP listing 1980)(NPS designation 1987)

This 279-acre theme park is owned and operated by Westchester County and includes rides, games, an indoor skating rink or Ice Casino, beach, a boardwalk, and concession stands. It is one of only two amusement parks in the country with National Historic Landmark status, the other one being Kennywood in Pennsylvania. It has been a popular destination since it first opened in 1928. Its wooden roller coaster, the Dragon Coaster, built in 1929, is one of the last roller coaster rides built by engineer Frederick Church that is still operating. The Derby Racer, also built by Church, is one of only three rides of its kind remaining in the world. Glenn Close's and Ellen Latzen's characters ride the roller coaster in the 1980s thriller film, Fatal Attraction. Airplane Coaster, Church's most acclaimed coaster, was removed in 1957. Playland is also the setting for several key scenes in the 1988 comedy film Big, starring Tom Hanks

Sites on the National Register of Historic Places

Of the more than 88,000 sites in the country that are listed on the National Register of Historic Places (NRHP), Rye has 8.

  The Square House originally known as Widow Haviland's Tavern (NRHP listing 1974) Owned by the Rye Historical Society, this inn/tavern was built in 1730. George Washington stayed at the inn on two separate occasions, remarking favorably on his experience in his diaries.
  Timothy Knapp House, (NRHP listing 1982) The oldest house in the city is owned by the Rye Historical Society and dates to around 1667. Notable for its location at the juncture of the Peningo Trail, a Native American path 
  Milton Cemetery (NRHP listing 1982) 
  United States Post Office – Rye, (NRHP listing 1989)
  Rye Town Park-Bathing Complex and Oakland Beach, (NRHP listing 2003)
  Rye African-American Cemetery, (NRHP listing 2003)
  Bird Homestead, (NRHP listing 2010)
  Rye Meeting House, (NRHP listing 2011).

Local landmarks
  Haines-Robinson House (1867), 556 Milton Road
  Jay Estate (formerly known as the Alansten District), 210 Boston Post Road
  Stillman Residence (1915), 235 Boston Post Road
  Village Green, Purchase Street

Additional historic resources
Of note are two 200 plus year old milestones labeled 24 and 25 on the Boston Post Road, oldest thoroughfare in the United States. The concept of mile markers to measure the distance from New York City was originated in 1763 by Benjamin Franklin during his term as Postmaster General. These sandstone markers likely date from 1802 when the Westchester Turnpike was configured.

Rye is also home to a rare 1938 WPA mural by realist Guy Pene du Bois which is located within the city's Post Office lobby and titled John Jay at His Home.

Rye is home to two of the 14 sites on the African American Heritage Trail of Westchester County- The Rye African-American Cemetery and the Jay Estate.

Cemeteries and burial grounds

 Greenwood Union Cemetery – originally known as Union Cemetery; founded in 1837
 Guion Cemetery
 Milton Cemetery – oldest recorded burial is 1708
 Rye African-American Cemetery – established in 1860
 St. Mary's Cemetery – earliest burial 1854
 Playland Ice Casino – site of Native American burying ground 
 Unnamed African American Cemetery between Apawamis and Grace Church Street with burials prior to 1860
 Unnamed African American Cemetery near Old Boston Post Road and Playland Parkway with burials prior to 1860

Churches and synagogues

 Community Synagogue of Rye
 Christ's Church (Episcopal) – established in 1695 as Grace Church; current building erected in 1866
 Church of the Resurrection
 Congregation Emanu-El of Westchester
 Rye Presbyterian Church

Parks and recreation

Parks and nature reserves
Rye has over 454 acres of green open space with multiple types of usage from active to passive recreation including walking, hiking, bird-watching and dog walking. It is also a significant coastal community. In 1991, the City of Rye authored a Local Waterfront Revitalization Program (LWRP) to provide clear guidance for addressing future water conservation and preservation issues 
 Edith G. Read Wildlife Sanctuary (179 acres) established in 1985.
 Jay Estate (23 acres) – opened as a park in 1992; site of 1917 Palmer Indoor Tennis Court currently undergoing restoration for public use. Dogs on leash allowed.
 Marshlands Conservancy (137 acres/147 with tidal lands), originally called the Devereux Reservation, opened as nature preserve in 1966. No dogs allowed.
 Rye Nature Center (47 acres) acquired by city in 1956 and opened in 1957.
 Rye Nursery Park (6.74 acres) – acquired "for wetland restoration and park uses"  and deemed as "crucial land in the Long Island Sound Estuary" in 2001 following a recommendation by the Comprehensive Conservation and Management Plan for the Long Island Sound with the help of $3.1 million from the NY State and the Clean Water State Revolving Fund CWSRF administered by New York State Department of Environmental Conservation and NY State Environmental Facilities Corporation (EFC); also supported by the Westchester Land Trust and approved for $1.6 million in funding from The Clean Water/Clean Air Bond Act.
 Rye Town Park (62 acres) – opened as a park in 1909 and jointly owned with the Town of Rye. Walking, dog friendly during appropriate seasonal hours. Recipient of multiple grants to fund ADA compliance including $300,000 grant from the State Office of Parks and Recreation

Private and public clubs
Rye has numerous private country clubs, many of which were formed in the late 19th and early 20th century. The combined acreage of these clubs affords members and guests over 993 acres of recreation.
 American Yacht Club (New York) (1883) (12 acres+) – sailing, tennis, paddle
 The Apawamis Club (1890) (120 acres) – golf, squash, tennis, paddle, swimming
 The Coveleigh Club (1933) (13 acres) – tennis, swimming, beach, bocce
 Manursing Island Club (1912) (65 acres) – tennis, swimming, beach
 Rye Golf Club (1921) (126 acres) (formerly known as Rye Country Club  and Ryewood) – golf, swimming 
 Shenorock Shore Club (1945) (former site of defunct Milton Point Casino) (12+ acres)- tennis, swimming, beach
 Westchester Country Club (1922) (Main Club: 583 acres; Beach Club:62 acres; 645 Total acres) – golf, tennis, squash, paddle, swimming, beach

Recreation facilities
Access to recreation in Rye is plentiful with numerous public, private and shared sports facilities from tennis, to ice hockey to boating.

Rye recreation facilities (79 acres total) (city owned and operated)
 Damiano Recreation Center (1.5 acres)
 Disbrow Park (51 acres) – 4 tennis courts, baseball – 12 acres dedicated as a park in 1930 with acreage added in 1931 by Mayor John Motley Morehead  Includes a former city landfill.
 Gagliardo Park (2.5 acres)
 Rye Nursery Park – (6.74 acres) natural grass soccer and lacrosse fields
 Rye Recreation Park (17 acres) – tennis courts, soccer fields

Other recreation facilities owned by city
 Rye Boat Basin/Marina – boating
 Rye Golf Club (126 acres) – golf, swimming; course designed by Devereux Emmet in 1921  
 Rye High School – football, tennis, track; the Rye High School sports teams are named the Garnets.
 Osborn School
 Midland School
 Milton School

Recreation facilities not owned by city
 Playland Ice Casino – skating, hockey
 Row America Rye – rowing
 Rye Country Day School – skating, hockey; the Rye Country Day teams are named the Wildcats.
 Rye YMCA – swimming, fitness
 School of the Holy Child (18 acres)
 Tide Mill Yacht Basin

Education

Nursery school programs
 Rye Presbyterian
 Christ's Church
 Community Synagogue of Rye

Public schools
Rye is served by three public elementary schools: Osborn, Milton, and Midland.

Rye Middle School and Rye High School are part of the same campus, and the two buildings connect.

The Greenhaven and The Preserve at Rye neighborhoods of the City of Rye are served by the Rye Neck School District. Rye Neck High School and Middle School are on one campus also located partially in the City of Rye.

Rye High School has been named a Gold Medal school and the 61st-best high school in the U.S., ninth-best in New York state, and best in New York state if test-in schools are disregarded, according to U.S. News & World Reports 2013 "Best High Schools".  The annual Rye-Harrison football game has been played for more than 80 years and is a top high school football rivalry in Westchester County.

Rye schools were recently ranked #18 in New York State with "A" ratings in all aspects except diversity.

Private schools
 Rye Country Day School, Pre-K through 12th grade, a college preparatory school
 School of the Holy Child (18 acres), for girls, grades 5–12. The school was founded in 1904.
 Resurrection Elementary School (grammar school/middle school) is a Catholic school located in Rye.

Media

Cable 
 Rye TV

Newspapers and print 
 The Rye Record – The Rye Record has been Rye's community paper for 22 years. Once starring Florence Cijffers the Rye Record has had its fair share of celebs
 The Rye Chronicle
 Rye Rising
 The Rye City Review

Website only and blogs 
 My Rye
 Rye Moms

Infrastructure

Transportation
The Rye train station provides commuter rail service to Grand Central Terminal in New York City or Stamford and New Haven-Union Station via the Metro-North Railroad's New Haven Line. The Bee-Line Bus System provides bus service to Rye on routes 13 and 61 with additional seasonal service to Rye Playland on routes 75 and 91.

Police department 
The City of Rye police department has 36 sworn-in officers police officers and about six auxiliary police officers.  They operate a fleet of Ford Crown Victorias, Chevrolet Tahoes, and one military-surplus truck used for emergency services. There is also one Toyota Prius for parking enforcement. The Rye Auxiliary Police is an all-volunteer force that provides assistance when needed. The Westchester County Police also patrols several areas of Rye, such as Playland Park, and The Marshlands.  New York State Police patrols Interstate 95 and 287 while the MTA Police patrols the Rye Train station and property within the Metro North right-of-way.

Fire department
The City of Rye Fire Department is a combination department consisting of 100 volunteer firefighters (only 20 active) and 21 career firefighters of which 4–5 are on duty at all times. The department has two fire stations and man three engines, two ladders, two utility units, and two command vehicles. The Rye Fire Department responds to approximately 1,000 emergency calls annually and does not respond to medical calls.

Emergency medical services 
Emergency medical service is provided by Port Chester-Rye-Rye Brook EMS at the Advanced Life Support Level (ALS). They are a combination agency with 50 members (30 paid EMTs, 15 paramedics and five volunteers). They operate up to five ALS ambulances and three paramedic flycars from their station in Port Chester and responds to over 5,000 calls a year between Port Chester, Rye and Rye Brook.

Notable people 

 Roz Abrams, former WABC-TV and WCBS-TV news anchors
 Christopher Atkins, actor
 Raymond E. Baldwin, US Senator
 Lex Barker, actor
 Jason Bateman, actor
 Justine Bateman, actress
 Alex Blum, cartoonist
 James Bradley, author
 James Roosevelt Bayley, Catholic bishop
 John Bello, founder SoBe Beverages; former president NFL Properties
 Greg Berlanti, TV writer
 Ralph Branca, Major League Baseball pitcher
 Roy J. Bostock, Former Chairman of Yahoo!
 Daniel Burke, Former President of The American Broadcasting Company
 Barbara Bush, First Lady, attended Milton Elementary School
 Doja Cat, rapper and singer partly raised in Rye by her grandmother
 Nelson Chai, Former CFO of Merrill Lynch and Bank of America
 Bud Cort, actor
 Eamonn Coghlan, Olympic track and field  athlete
 Buster Crabbe, actor and Olympic swimmer
 Mike D'Antoni, head coach of the NBA's Houston Rockets
 William Davis, golfer
 Jennifer Donnelly, author
 Eddie Eagan, sportsman
 Amelia Earhart, aviator; first woman to fly solo across the Atlantic Ocean (Born in Atchison, Kansas)
 Betty Francis, fictional character
 Mario Gabelli, stock investor, investment advisor, and financial analyst
 David Gottesman, businessman and billionaire
 Michael Grabner, professional hockey player
 Molly Guion, artist
 Sean Haggerty (born 1976), ice hockey player
 Mark Halstead, footballer 
 Irving Harper, industrial designer
 Justin Henry, actor
 Thomas B. Hess, art writer and curator
 Alan J. Hoffman, famous mathematician
 Harold Holzer, Lincoln scholar
 Iakovos, Archbishop of America, (1911–2005)
 Marc Jacobs, fashion designer
 Ajit Jain, head of several reinsurance businesses for Berkshire Hathaway
 Elizabeth Janeway, author
 John Jay, Founding Father, negotiator of the Treaty of Paris, first Chief Justice of the United States, two-time Governor of New York State, anti-slavery advocate, and diplomat
 Peter Augustus Jay (lawyer), President of the NY Manumission Society
 John Clarkson Jay, physician and notable conchologist
 Mary Rutherfurd Jay, landscape architect
 Pierre Jay, first chairman of the Federal Reserve Bank of New York
 Arthur Judson, artists' and orchestra manager
 Megyn Kelly, Today Show contributor
Christopher Kimball, chef, publisher of Cook's Illustrated and Cook's Country, co-founder of "America's Test Kitchen", and founder of Christopher Kimball's Milk Street Kitchen.
 Ralph Kiner, professional baseball player and broadcaster
 Robert A. Kindler, Global Head of Mergers and Acquisitions and Vice Chairman of Morgan Stanley
 George Kirby, professional baseball player
 Nick Kroll, actor, comedian
 George Latimer (New York politician), politician, Westchester County Executive
 David Lee, physicist
 Brendan McCole, Gaelic footballer
 John Mack, Morgan Stanley CEO
 Wellington Mara, owner of NFL New York Giants
 William Moulton Marston, creator of Wonder Woman
 Eugene R. McGrath, former Chairman and CEO of Consolidated Edison
 Allegra Mertz, championship sailor
 Charles E. F. Millard, President of PBGC
 Diana Millay, actress
 Jay Pierrepont Moffat, US Ambassador
 John Motley Morehead III, mayor of Rye, chemist, philanthropist
 Ogden Nash, poet
 Eric Nisenson, author
 Caroline Love Goodwin O'Day, US Congresswoman
 Nicholas Patrick, astronaut, Mission Specialist 1 on 2006 Discovery STS-116 mission
 George P. Putnam, author
 Steven C. Rattner, owner of Hard Rock Casino in Las Vegas
 Edith Gwynne Read, conservationist
 Joy Reidenberg, television star of nature documentaries on PBS, NatGeo Wild, Discovery
 Blanche Ring, Broadway actress and singer
 Zelia Peet Ruebhausen, policy advisor, UN observer
 James Sands, professional soccer player for NYCFC and USMNT
 Tatiana Saunders, soccer player in Iceland, France and England
 Liz Sheridan, actress
 Debora Shuger, author
 Adam Silver, commissioner of NBA
 Bill Stern, actor and sportscaster
 Stuart Sternberg (born 1959), owner of the Tampa Bay Rays
 B. J. Surhoff, Major League Baseball player
 John Thain, former Merrill Lynch CEO
 Edgar Wachenheim III, investor and author
 Diana Williams, WABC-TV news anchor
 Kimberly Williams, actress
 Bob Woodruff, ABC television journalist
 Sean Young, actress

In popular culture
 The 1995 music video for Mariah Carey's Fantasy featuring Ol' Dirty Bastard was shot at Rye Playland.
 In the television series Mad Men, Rye is the home of Henry and Betty Francis and Betty's three children from her previous marriage to Don Draper. The Francis family lives there from 1965 to 1970.
 One of the early scenes from the 1988 movie "Big" was shot at Rye Playland.
 Several episodes of Season 3 of Apple TV's show Dickinson about the poet Emily Dickinson were filmed at the Jay Heritage Center in 2021. 
 The Vampire Weekend song "Finger Back" (2013) references the town.
 Rye is mentioned in the song American Pie, by Don McLean: "good old boys were drinkin' whiskey in Rye".

References

External links

 

 
Cities in Westchester County, New York
Cities in New York (state)
Populated places established in 1660
1660 establishments in the Dutch Empire
1660 establishments in North America
Cities in the New York metropolitan area
Populated coastal places in New York (state)
Establishments in New Netherland